In theoretical computer science, Baker's technique is a method for designing polynomial-time approximation schemes (PTASs) for problems on planar graphs. It is named after Brenda Baker, who announced it in a 1983 conference and published it in the Journal of the ACM in 1994.

The idea for Baker's technique is to break the graph into layers, such that the problem can be solved optimally on each layer, then combine the solutions from each layer in a reasonable way that will result in a feasible solution.  This technique has given PTASs for the following problems: subgraph isomorphism, maximum independent set, minimum vertex cover, minimum dominating set, minimum edge dominating set, maximum triangle matching, and many others.

The bidimensionality theory of  Erik Demaine, Fedor Fomin, Hajiaghayi, and Dimitrios Thilikos and its offshoot simplifying decompositions generalizes and greatly expands the applicability of Baker's technique
for a vast set of problems on planar graphs and more generally  graphs excluding a fixed minor, such as bounded genus graphs, as well as to other classes of graphs not closed under taking minors such as the 1-planar graphs.

Example of technique
The example that we will use to demonstrate Baker's technique is the maximum weight independent set problem.

Algorithm
 INDEPENDENT-SET()
     Choose an arbitrary vertex 
     
     find the breadth-first search levels for  rooted at  : 
 
     for 
         find the components  of  after deleting 
 
     for 
        compute , the maximum-weight independent set of 
 
     
     let  be the solution of maximum weight among 
 
     return 

Notice that the above algorithm is feasible because each  is the union of disjoint independent sets.

Dynamic programming
Dynamic programming is used when we compute the maximum-weight independent set for each . This dynamic program works because each  is a -outerplanar graph. Many NP-complete problems can be solved with dynamic programming on -outerplanar graphs. Baker's technique can be interpreted as covering the given planar graphs with subgraphs of this type, finding the solution to each subgraph using dynamic programming, and gluing the solutions together.

References

 .
 .
 .
 .
 .
 .
 .
 .
.

1983 in computing
Planar graphs
Approximation algorithms